Robert Strickland "Si" Bell (April 18, 1894 – March 12, 1972) was a college football player.

Georgia Tech
Bell was prominent end for the Georgia Tech Golden Tornado of the Georgia Institute of Technology.  He was twice selected All-Southern.

1916
Bell was a starter for the 222–0 rout of Cumberland.

1917
He was also a member of Tech's first national championship team in 1917 which outscored opponents 491 to 17. Bell left to join the American effort in the First World War as a marine just a week after celebrating the national championship.

References

1894 births
1972 deaths
People from Spalding County, Georgia
Players of American football from Georgia (U.S. state)
American football ends
Georgia Tech Yellow Jackets football players
All-Southern college football players